Victorian Photonics Network was a photonics industry organisation for the photonics cluster in Victoria, Australia.  It was established on 23 October 2002 as an initiative of the State Government of Victoria.

The organisation participated in developing a new VCE physics study design.

The chairman is Peter Gerrand, previously CEO of Melbourne IT.

The organisation ceased to exist as of May 2015.

References

Sources
 http://spie.org/industry-resources/photonics-clusters/victorian-photonics-network
 https://archive.today/20060917112348/http://www.mmv.vic.gov.au/Photonics
 http://www.theage.com.au/articles/2003/08/18/1061059758230.html
 http://www.parliament.vic.gov.au/archive/etc/Submissions/prof_learn/australaininstituteofphysics270607.pdf
 https://www.kingfisherfiber.com/about/milestones-achievements/

External links
 Website
 Victorian Photonics Network on Multimedia Victoria website

Photonics companies
2002 establishments in Australia
2015 disestablishments in Australia